Gérard-Maurice Eugène Huyghe was a 20th-century French Catholic Bishop.

Born 31 August 1909 in Fives-Lille, France, he was ordained a priest on 29 June 1933.

Consecrated Bishop: 4 November 1962. He was Bishop of Arras (France) for almost 40 years from December 1961 to September 1984.

He died in October 2001 aged 91 years.
 
He was an attendee at Vatican 2.

References

Bishops of Arras
1909 births
2001 deaths
20th-century Roman Catholic bishops in France